The Tahltan Highland is an upland area of plateau and relatively lower mountain ranges in British Columbia, Canada, lying east of the Boundary Ranges and south of the Inklin River (the east fork of the Taku River). Its eastern boundary is formed by the Sheslay River and the Little Tuya River, while its southern boundary extends across the Stikine River and its Grand Canyon to include the Mount Edziza volcanic complex (which includes the Spectrum Range), and the Zagoddethchino massif.

References
S. Holland.  Landforms of British Columbia, BC Government Department of Energy Mines and Resources (1976).

 
Stikine Country
Stikine Plateau
Plateaus of British Columbia